Call of the Forest may refer to:
 Call of the Forest (1965 film), an Austrian drama film
 Call of the Forest (1949 film), an American Western film